The following places in Quebec, Canada are named Saint-
Saint-Joseph Lake (La Jacques-Cartier), a freshwater body in Capitale-Nationale
Lac-Saint-Joseph, Quebec
Saint-Joseph-de-Beauce, Quebec
Saint-Joseph-de-Coleraine, Quebec
Saint-Joseph-de-Kamouraska, Quebec
Saint-Joseph-de-Lepage, Quebec
Saint-Joseph-des-Érables, Quebec
Saint-Joseph-de-Sorel, Quebec
Saint-Joseph-du-Lac, Quebec
 Ham-Sud, Quebec, formerly known as  Saint-Joseph-de-Ham-Sud

See also  
Saint Joseph (disambiguation)
Saint Joseph's (disambiguation)